A love affair is a form of romantic relationship.

Love Affair may also refer to:

Films
Love Affair (1932 film), starring Dorothy Mackaill and Humphrey Bogart
Love Affair (1939 film), starring Irene Dunne and Charles Boyer
Love Affair, or the Case of the Missing Switchboard Operator, a 1967 Yugoslav film
Love Affair (1994 film), featuring Annette Bening, Warren Beatty and Katharine Hepburn
The Love Affair (film), a 2015 film
Love Affair(s), a 2020 French film
Love Affair (unreleased film), an unreleased Indian film

Music
 Love Affair (band), an English pop and soul band, formed in 1966
 Love Affair, a 1992 album by Gloria Gaynor
 Love Affair (album), a 1996 album by Amii Stewart
 "Love Affair", the B-side of Sal Mineo's 1957 song "Start Movin' (In My Direction)"
 "Love Affair", a song by Toni Braxton from the 1993 album Toni Braxton
 "Love Affair", a song by Kylie Minogue from the 2001 album Fever

Other uses
A Love Affair (Italian: Un amore), a 1963 novel by Dino Buzzati

See also
Love Affair, or the Case of the Missing Switchboard Operator, a 1967 Yugoslav film
Affair